The Osman Shah Mosque or Kursum Mosque (Κουρσούμ Τζαμί, from ) is a 16th-century Ottoman mosque in the city of Trikala in Greece.

Description 
The mosque was commissioned by Osman Shah, also known as Kara Osman Pasha, who was the son of one of Sultan Selim I's daughters and the executed vizier İskender Pasha (died 1515).  Osman Shah for a long time dwelt in Trikala as the governor of the local province, the Sanjak of Trikala. The mosque was designed by the Ottoman imperial architect Mimar Sinan and is the only one that lies in modern Greece. 

The exact dating of the mosque is uncertain, but it was probably built in the period 1550–60, most likely in the late 1550s. Osman attached several charitable establishments to the mosque, among others a madrasah, an alms house, and a caravanserai, and was himself buried in a türbe in the mosque's southern courtyard at the time of his death in 1567/8. By the time of Evliya Çelebi's visit a century later, the mosque was the principal mosque of the city.

It is also the only mosque still standing in the city of Trikala out of the at least eight that Evliya Çelebi reported seeing. The building itself consists of a square prayer hall topped by a large  diameter semi-spherical dome. The  portico (revak) in front, was completely rebuilt in the renovations carried out in 1998. The ashlar minaret is located on the northwestern corner and is well preserved, except for its missing roof. All other buildings attached to the mosque have since vanished, except for the founder's octagonal türbe (tomb), which is used as a storage site for artefacts recovered from archaeological excavations.

See also 
 List of Friday mosques designed by Mimar Sinan
 List of mosques in Greece
 Islam in Greece

References

Sources

External links
 

16th-century mosques
Mimar Sinan buildings
Ottoman mosques in Greece
Buildings and structures in Trikala
Ottoman architecture in Thessaly
16th-century architecture in Greece
Former mosques in Greece
Mosque buildings with domes